Gleixhe is a village of Wallonia in the municipality of Flémalle, district of Awirs, located in the province of Liège, Belgium. 

It was a municipality until July 6th 1964, when it became part of the municipality of Awirs. Awirs itself was made a district of the municipality of Flémalle in the 1977 fusion of Belgian municipalities.

Buildings
The important buildings in the hamlet are the church of Saint-Lambert and the Château de Hautepenne (or Haultepenne Castle).

Localities
Boubou
Bouhet
Boverie
Broussoux
Godin
Hautepenne
Rond Fawe
Thier Pays
Long Barre

Data from 1950
Population: 260
Area: 203 ha
Density: 128.08/km2

Sub-municipalities of Flémalle
Former municipalities of Liège Province